The Acaray Dam is a hydroelectric dam situated in Hernandarias, Paraguay.

HVDC-back-to-back station 
The power plant's switchyard has a HVDC back-to-back station built by Siemens in 1981. It converts the electrical frequency from 50 hertz to 60 hertz to supply electricity to Brazil's power grid, which operates at 60 Hz (Paraguay's power grid operates at a frequency of 50 hertz).

Culture 
It is depicted in the 50 guaranies coin in Paraguay.

See also 

 List of power stations in Paraguay

Notes

Energy infrastructure completed in 1981
Hydroelectric power stations in Paraguay
Ciudad del Este